Secret Sinners (German:Heimliche Sünder) is a 1926 German silent film directed by Franz Seitz and starring Dorothea Wieck, Mary Kid and Margarete Kupfer.

The film's art direction was by Willy Reiber. It was made at the Emelka Studios in Munich.

Cast
 Dorothea Wieck 
 Mary Kid 
 Margarete Kupfer 
 Maria Kamradek 
 Hans Leibelt 
 Victor Colani 
 Hermann Pfanz 
 Felix Gluth

References

Bibliography
 Horst O. Hermanni. Das Film ABC Band 5: Von La Jana bis Robert Mulligan. 2011.

External links

1926 films
Films of the Weimar Republic
Films directed by Franz Seitz
German silent feature films
Bavaria Film films
German black-and-white films
Films shot at Bavaria Studios